The following is a list of the 93 counties in the U.S. state of Nebraska, listed by name, FIPS code and license plate prefix.

Nebraska's postal abbreviation is NE and its FIPS state code is 31.

When many counties were formed, the bills establishing them did not state the honoree's full name; thus the namesakes of several counties, including Brown, Deuel, Dixon, and possibly Harlan, are known only by their surnames.

County list

|}

Former counties 

 Clay (1855-1864) Formed from unorganized territory and dissolved into Gage and Lancaster County.
 Jackson (1855-1856) Formed from unorganized territory and dissolved to Fillmore County and unorganized territory
 Johnson (1855-1856) Formed from unorganized territory and dissolved to unorganized territory
 Blackbird (1855-1888) Formed from Burt County and dissolved to Thurston County
 Loup (1855-1856) Formed from Burt and Un-Organized and then dissolved Madison, Monroe and Platte Counties
 Jones (1856-1866) Formed from unorganized territory and dissolved into Jefferson County.
 Grant, Harrison, Jackson, Lynn, Monroe and Taylor counties listed in 1870 - see map
 West (1860-1862) Formed from unorganized territory and dissolved into Holt County

References

Nebraska, counties in
 
Counties